Petite France (쁘띠프랑스) is a French-style theme park that was constructed in July 2008 in Gyeonggi Province, South Korea.

References

External links

Jeon, Jong Min. "Lantern festival of Petite France in gapyeong." Incheonilbo. 9 December 2015.
Jo, Young Jun. "2nd European doll festival held in Petite France." Asian Economy. 15 July 2015.
Jang, Guang Young. "Petite France is included in Korean 100 attractions." gukjenews. 10 April 2015.

Gapyeong County
Amusement parks in South Korea
2008 establishments in South Korea
France–South Korea relations